The Valsalva maneuver is performed by a forceful attempt of exhalation against a closed airway, usually done by closing one's mouth and pinching one's nose shut while expelling air out as if blowing up a balloon. Variations of the maneuver can be used either in medical examination as a test of cardiac function and autonomic nervous control of the heart, or to clear the ears and sinuses (that is, to equalize pressure between them) when ambient pressure changes, as in scuba diving, hyperbaric oxygen therapy, or air travel.

A modified version is done by expiring against a closed glottis. This will elicit the cardiovascular responses described below but will not force air into the Eustachian tubes.

History 
The technique is named after Antonio Maria Valsalva, a 17th-century physician and anatomist from Bologna whose principal scientific interest was the human ear. He described the Eustachian tube and the maneuver to test its patency (openness). He also described the use of this maneuver to expel pus from the middle ear.

Physiological response

The normal physiological response consists of four phases.
 Initial pressure rise
 On application of expiratory force, pressure rises inside the chest forcing blood out of the pulmonary circulation into the left atrium. This causes a mild rise in stroke volume during the first few seconds of the maneuver.
 Reduced venous return and compensation
 Return of systemic blood to the heart is impeded by the pressure inside the chest. The output of the heart is reduced and stroke volume falls. This occurs from 5 to about 14 seconds in the illustration. The fall in stroke volume reflexively causes blood vessels to constrict with some rise in pressure (15 to 20 seconds). This compensation can be quite marked with pressure returning to near or even above normal, but the cardiac output and blood flow to the body remains low. During this time the pulse rate increases (compensatory tachycardia).
 Pressure release
 The pressure on the chest is released, allowing the pulmonary vessels and the aorta to re-expand causing a further initial slight fall in stroke volume (20 to 23 seconds) due to decreased left atrial return and increased aortic volume, respectively. Venous blood can once more enter the chest and the heart, cardiac output begins to increase.
 Return of cardiac output
 Blood return to the heart is enhanced by the effect of entry of blood which had been dammed back, causing a rapid increase in cardiac output (24 seconds on). The stroke volume usually rises above normal before returning to a normal level. With return of blood pressure, the pulse rate returns towards normal.

Deviation from this response pattern signifies either abnormal heart function or abnormal autonomic nervous control of the heart. Valsalva is also used by dentists following extraction of a maxillary molar tooth. The maneuver is performed to determine if a perforation or antral communication exists.

Applications

Normalizing middle-ear pressures 
When rapid ambient pressure increase occurs as in underwater diving or aircraft descent, this pressure tends to hold the Eustachian tubes closed, preventing pressure equalization across the ear drum, with painful results. To avoid this painful situation, divers, caisson workers and aircrew attempt to open the Eustachian tubes by swallowing, which tends to open the tubes, allowing the ear to equalize itself.

If this fails, then the Valsalva maneuver may be used. This maneuver, when used as a tool to equalize middle ear pressure, carries with it the risk of auditory damage from over pressurization of the middle ear. The Valsalva maneuver generates about 20–40 mm of Hg pressure. It is safer, if time permits, to attempt to open the Eustachian tubes by swallowing a few times, or yawning, or by using the Valsalva technique of breathing a very small amount of air gently into nostrils held closed by the fingers as soon as mild pressure is felt, before it increases to the point that its release would be painful. The effectiveness of the "yawning" method can be improved with practice; some people are able to achieve release or opening by moving their jaw forward or forward and down, rather than straight down as in a classical yawn, and some can do so without moving their jaw at all by activating the tensor tympani muscle, which is heard by the individual as a deep, rumbling sound. Opening can often be clearly heard by the practitioner, thus providing feedback that the maneuver was successful.

During swallowing or yawning, several muscles in the pharynx (throat) act to elevate the soft palate and open the throat. One of these muscles, the tensor veli palatini, also acts to open the Eustachian tube. This is why swallowing or yawning is successful in equalizing middle ear pressure. Contrary to popular belief, the jaw does not pinch the tubes shut when it is closed. In fact, the Eustachian tubes are not located close enough to the mandible to be pinched off. People often recommend chewing gum during ascent/descent in aircraft, because chewing gum increases the rate of salivation, and swallowing the excess saliva opens the Eustachian tubes.

In a clinical setting the Valsalva maneuver will commonly be done either against a closed glottis, or against an external pressure measuring device, thus eliminating or minimizing the pressure on the Eustachian tubes. Straining or blowing against resistance as in blowing up balloons has a Valsalva effect and the fall in blood pressure can result in dizziness and even fainting.

Strength training 
The Valsalva maneuver is commonly believed to be the optimal breathing pattern for producing maximal force and is frequently used in powerlifting to stabilize the trunk during exercises such as the squat, deadlift, and bench press, and in both lifts of Olympic weightlifting. Additionally, competitive strongmen often use the Valsalva maneuver in things such as log press, yoke walks, and stone loading, as well as any other strongman movements.

Pain management 
The Valsalva maneuver can be used as a means to reduce pain during lumbar puncture. According to Kumar, et. al, performing the maneuver on an awake patient triggers predictable cardiovascular and autonomic responses that can be timed by a skilled surgeon to maximize anesthetic benefit for the patient.

Regulation of heart rhythm 
The Valsalva maneuver may be used to arrest episodes of supraventricular tachycardia. Blood pressure (BP) rises at onset of straining-because the increased intrathoracic pressure (ITP) is added to the pressure in the aorta. It then falls because the ITP compresses the veins, decreasing the venous return and cardiac output. This inhibits the baroreceptors causing tachycardia and a rise in peripheral vascular resistance (PVR). When the glottis is opened and the ITP returns to normal, cardiac output is restored but the peripheral vessels are constricted. The blood pressure therefore rises above normal and this stimulated the baroreceptors, causing bradycardia and a drop in BP to normal level.

Medical diagnostics

Cardiology 

The maneuver can sometimes be used to diagnose heart abnormalities, especially when used in conjunction with an echocardiogram. For example, the Valsalva maneuver (phase II) increases the intensity of hypertrophic cardiomyopathy murmurs, namely those of dynamic subvalvular left ventricular outflow obstruction. At the same time, the Valsalva maneuver (phase II) decreases the intensity of most other murmurs, including aortic stenosis and atrial septal defect. During the first few seconds of the Valsalva maneuver (phase I) the opposite findings will be the case.

A UK-based randomized controlled trial (REVERT) demonstrated that in patients with cardiovascularly stable supraventricular tachycardia, a modified Valsalva maneuver started in semi-recumbent position followed by  repositioning of the patient to a supine position with a passive leg raise immediately after the strain has and increased 43% success rate compared to the only 17% effectiveness of the conventional Valsalva maneuver in terminating supraventricular tachycardia.

Neurology 
The Valsalva maneuver is used to aid in the clinical diagnosis of problems or injury in the nerves of the cervical spine. Upon performing the Valsalva maneuver, intraspinal pressure slightly increases. Thus, neuropathies or radicular pain may be felt or exacerbated, and this may indicate impingement on a nerve by an intervertebral disc or other part of the anatomy. Headache and pain upon performing the Valsalva maneuver is also one of the main symptoms in Arnold–Chiari malformation. The Valsalva maneuver may be of use in checking for a dural tear following certain spinal operations such as a microdiscectomy. An increase in intra-spinal pressure will cause cerebral spinal fluid (CSF) to leak out of the dura causing a headache.

The Valsalva maneuver has been associated with transient global amnesia.

Palpation of supraclavicular lymph nodes 
As the lymph nodes may be buried, asking the patient to perform the Valsalva maneuver can push the cupola of the lung upward bringing deep-seated nodes to a more accessible position for palpation. Palpation may identify an enlargement of the supraclavicular lymph nodes which is a diagnostic indicator of cancer. The prevalence of malignancy in the presence of supraclavicular lymphadenopathy is reported to be in the range of 54% to 85%.

Oral–antral communication 
A variant of the Valsalva maneuver is used to aid diagnosis of oral–antral communication, i.e. the existence of a connection between the oral cavity and the maxillary sinus.

Urogenital medicine 
The Valsalva maneuver is used to aid diagnosis of intrinsic sphincteric deficiency (ISD) in urodynamic tests. Valsalva leak point pressure is the minimum vesicular pressure that is associated with urine leakage. Although there is no consensus on the threshold value, values > 60 cm H2O are commonly considered to indicate hypermobility of the bladder neck and normal sphincter function. Also, when examining women with pelvic organ prolapse, asking the patient to perform the Valsalva maneuver is used to demonstrate maximum pelvic organ descent.

Complications

Preretinal 
Valsalva retinopathy is pathological syndrome associated with the Valsalva maneuver. It presents as preretinal hemorrhage (bleeding in front of the retina) in people with a history of transient increase in the intrathoracic pressure and may be associated with heavy lifting, forceful coughing, straining on the toilet, or vomiting. The bleeding may cause visual loss if it obstructs the visual axis, and patients may note floaters in their visual field. Usually this causes no permanent visual impairments, and sight is fully restored.

Valsalva device in spacesuits 

Some spacesuits contain a device called the Valsalva device to enable the wearer to block their nose to perform the Valsalva maneuver when wearing the suit. Astronaut Drew Feustel describes it as "a spongy device called a Valsalva that is typically used to block the nose in case a pressure readjustment is needed". One use of the device is to equalize pressure during suit pressurization.

See also

References

External links 

 Definitions of various clinical tests for neuropathy
 
 

Aviation medicine
Diagnostic cardiology
Diving medicine
Ear procedures
Human physiology
Italian inventions
Underwater diving procedures